Cecil Joseph Kempf (November 20, 1927 – February 17, 2017) was a vice admiral in the United States Navy. He was Chief of the United States Naval Reserve from November 1983 until May 1987.

Kempf graduated from the United States Naval Academy in 1950. After completing flight school, he was designated a Naval Aviator in November 1951. Kempf later earned an M.S. degree in Aeronautical Engineering from the Massachusetts Institute of Technology in 1957.

Kempf died in February 2017 at the age of 89.

References

1927 births
2017 deaths
People from Maud, Oklahoma
United States Naval Academy alumni
United States Naval Aviators
MIT School of Engineering alumni
United States Navy personnel of the Vietnam War
United States Navy admirals
Recipients of the Legion of Merit
Recipients of the Navy Distinguished Service Medal